Leishmanolysin (promastigote surface endopeptidase, glycoprotein gp63, Leishmania metalloproteinase, surface acid proteinase, promastigote surface protease) is an enzyme. This enzyme catalyses the following chemical reaction

 Preference for hydrophobic residues at P1 and P1' and basic residues at P2' and P3'. A model nonapeptide is cleaved at -Ala-Tyr-Leu-Lys-Lys-

This membrane-bound glycoprotein is present in the promastigote of various species of Leishmania protozoans.

References

External links 
 

EC 3.4.24